Mish Mish, also spelled Michmich, is a village located in Akkar Governorate, Lebanon. Mish Mish is situated 1100 metres above sea level in the mountainous terrain of the north. The closest major city to the village is Tripoli 45 km to the west; the Lebanese capital Beirut is 129 km to the southwest.

History
The Akkar region was first inhabited by the Phoenicians but the original settlers of the Mish Mish village built mud brick homes around the mosque to stay close for prayers and also safety as there were plentiful dangerous wild animals such as hyenas that roamed the surrounding valleys and mountains. A few of the original mud brick homes are still standing near the village mosque. The village has seen many foreign occupiers pass through its lands such as the Crusaders, Ottoman Turks and the French colonial forces. Reminders of the area's past still exist in ruins around Mish Mish including road directions carved into rock, dirt roads used by invading forces and small castles or homes used by rulers. The most notable located 15 km away near the village of Old Akkar built in the late 10th century A.D. by Mouhriz Ibn Akkar, the castle was taken by the Crusaders in the 12th century and reconquered in 1271 by the Mamluk Sultan Baibars. During the Ottoman period, it belonged to the Kurdish feudal family the Banu Sayfa, then around 1620 it was partially destroyed by Emir Fakhreddine II. Husseins originated in this place.

Geography
Mish Mish is blessed with a surplus supply of fresh water compared to the majority of middle eastern countries that lack this valuable resource. The fresh springs are constant due to the snow that falls on the region in the winter months, when the snow melts in the following seasons it collects in the deep gorges and valleys to provide much needed fresh water. Major springs that offer water to the village are Abou Ali, Safsafa, Hawr, Tamima, Abou Moustafa, Ghaba, Abou sara sources. Springs used to water the lands are Ghasam, Hachem, Abour Richa, and the Deleb source. Mish Mish soil is arable and rocky which makes it more suited for tree growing. There are two main roads that connect the village to the coast with other regional roads that connect the regions villages together. There are numerous old dirt and rocky roads that still connect to the coast, regional villages and Syria.

Climate
The temperature ranges from -10 in the winter months to 35 °C during summer. Mish Mish receives heavy rain and snow during the winter. The village people during the winter stay indoors a lot and limit travel as at times roads to and around the village inaccessible.

Agriculture
Although mishmish means apricot, one would find it hard to locate a plant of the same name in the village's plentiful agricultural lands. Farmers from the village predominantly produce apples, pears and seeds.

Food
Mish Mish is known for its high quality Lebanese foods and beverages. Animal meats such as Beef, Lamb and chicken are main staples of the residents. A few of the dishes include Kibbeh, kofta, shawarma, falafel, manaeesh, hummus and tabouli. The village people are also skilled enough to make their own olive oil, cheese, yoghurt, Lebanese bread and pickled olives, turnip and cucumbers. Communal wood fired bread ovens exist in certain places of the village for the people to bake their own bread.

Population
The population of the village is approximately 18000 inhabitants, there are twelve family groups the Lebanese government have recognised in regard to  local election voting. Within the twelve family groups exist dozens of different family surnames that have branched off over the years and formed their own family names. All the families of the village are descendants of the original twelve family surnames listed with the government, these families were the original settlers of Mish Mish. The main families are Kamarelddin, One of the most important families whose name also originates from a'apricot'. Other families include Barakat, Dennawi, Houli (Most inhabited family in Australia), Abouzeid, Hamad, Eljamal, Zobit, Taleb, Abdo, Kaddour, Aldali, Osman, Haloum, Harba, Hussein, Badra, Kentar, Aboueid,  Kessab, Nasbeh, Baarini,  Saood, Kerdi, Khodr and Dib's. 

In the past few decades thousands of people have migrated from Mish Mish to Australia to commence a new life, this has resulted in a fairly large community being established in the Western Suburbs of Melbourne, Victoria where most have elected to settle. The Mish Mish people living in Australia initially commenced working in factories however during the past decade community members have become heavily involved in business and have enjoyed great success, as a result of the financial success of many community members, Mish Mish has enjoyed tremendous financial injection. Many of the migrants return to Mish Mish during the summer months for a holiday and often take younger family members along to introduce them to their native village and relatives.

Religion
The main religion of the village is Islam following the Sunni denomination. The village folk are generally conservative and practising Muslims in comparison to the high density urban areas of Lebanon.

People
The inhabitants of the village were originally farmers, however over the years the majority of the population have moved away from the land and sought higher education, gained trades, or sought work in the neighbouring cities and towns. The original settlers were nomadic Arabs that settled in the area due to the villages plentiful water supply and proximity to old trading routes. A significant percentage of the village population have also migrated overseas to countries such as Australia, Saudi Arabia, Canada, Brazil, United Arab Emirates, Gulf Arab states. Migration figures are high to even suggest that every family in the village would at least have or know of one friend or relative that have migrated to another country.

See also
List of cities in Lebanon

References

Bibliography

External links
 Mechmech (Aakkar), Localiban 

Populated places in Akkar District
Sunni Muslim communities in Lebanon